Manastir is a village in the municipality of Haskovo, in Haskovo Province, in southern Bulgaria.

Manastir Peak on Oscar II Coast in Graham Land, Antarctica is named after the village.

References

Villages in Haskovo Province